An interrupted gene (also called a split gene) is a gene that contains expressed regions of DNA called exons, split with unexpressed regions called introns (also called intervening regions). Exons provide instructions for coding proteins, which create mRNA necessary for the synthesis of proteins. Introns are removed by recognition of the donor site (5' end) and the splice acceptor site (3' end). The architecture of the interrupted gene allows for the process of alternative splicing, where various mRNA products can be produced from a single gene. The function of introns are still not fully understood and are called noncoding or junk DNA.

Discovery 
Interrupted genes were independently discovered by Richard J. Roberts and Phillip A. Sharp in 1977, for which they shared the 1993 Nobel Prize in Physiology or Medicine. Their discovery implied the existence of then-unknown machinery for splicing out introns and assembling genes; namely, the spliceosome. Unlike prokaryotic genomes, eukaryotic genomes were largely complex and inconsistent. It was soon accepted that 94% of human genes are interrupted, and 50% of hereditary diseases are involved in splicing intron errors out of interrupted genes. The best known example of a disease caused by a splicing error is Beta-thalassemia, in which extra intronic material is erroneously spliced into the gene for making hemoglobin.

Prokaryotes 
Unlike eukaryotes, prokaryotes have a less complex genome. The structure of prokaryotic genomes contain fewer to none regions of introns and have longer continuous lines of exons, or uninterrupted regions. In other words, they contain more regions of DNA that are expressed. The idea that genome density decreases as the complexity of the organism increases hold true. This is due to the fact that eukaryotes have a much stronger presence of introns than prokaryotes. For example, prokaryotes contain about 1000 genes/Mb while humans contain about 6 genes/Mb. Another example are lower eukaryotes, such as yeast, that have many uninterrupted regions. However, this does not mean that these sections are fully uninterrupted, as tRNA synthesis requires excision of a nucleotide sequence, followed by ligation.

Most bacteria have some interruption of some genes.  Interrupted genes are universal in eukaryotes; yeasts may display single interruptions of a minority of genes, while in higher organisms most genes are interrupted.  Some eukaryotes may contain multiple interruptions with introns that can be longer than exons.  Introns are well-conserved across evolutionary history, suggesting their structure has some importance for the organism. They are longer in advanced organisms (higher plants and animals). Longer growth and development requires longer sequences of gene activation and down-regulation.  Details of the role of introns in the regulation of gene accessibility and transcription have yet to be worked out.

References 

Molecular biology